The 1989–90 Oklahoma Sooners men's basketball team represented the University of Oklahoma in competitive college basketball during the 1989–90 NCAA Division I season. The Oklahoma Sooners men's basketball team played its home games in the Lloyd Noble Center and was a member of the National Collegiate Athletic Association's (NCAA) former Big Eight Conference at that time.  The team posted a 27–5 overall record and an 11–3 conference record to finish tied for second in the Conference for head coach Billy Tubbs.  This was the third Big Eight Conference tournament Championship for Tubbs and his third NCAA Division I men's basketball tournament #1 seed in a row.  The team earned the conference tournament championship competing in a conference in which three teams held the #1 national ranking in consecutive weeks in late February and early March.

The team was led by All-Big Eight Conference First Team selection Skeeter Henry. The team won its first twelve games, while rising to the #3 ranking, before losing back to back road games to unranked Kansas State and #23 Arizona.  The team then won three consecutive home games before losing to #2 Kansas on the road.  It then won four games before losing to #2 Missouri.  The team then won 8 contests in a row including back to back victories over #1 ranked teams (Missouri and Kansas) at the end of February as well as a rubber match victory against Kansas in the Big Eight Conference tournament semifinals.  The team earned the school's third consecutive #1 seed in the  1990 NCAA Division I men's basketball tournament, but was eliminated in the second round by North Carolina 79–77.

Terry Evans became the first Sooner to make all six of his three point shots in a game, and Jackie Jones set the school single-game record with 9 blocked shots. The team exploded for 173 points on November 29, 1989, against  and three nights later set another school record by defeating  by 95 points (146–51).  The team also established the current school record of 86 rebounds against U.S. International.

NCAA basketball tournament

The following were the team's results in the NCAA Division I men's basketball tournament.
West
 Oklahoma (1) 77, Towson State (16) 68
North Carolina (8) 79, Oklahoma 77

Awards and honors
All-Big Eight Conference first team: Skeeter Henry

Team players drafted into the NBA
No one from the Sooners was selected in the 1990 NBA draft. No varsity letter-winners from this team who were drafted in the NBA draft in later years:  However, Brent Price, who spent the year redshirtting was drafted in the 1992 NBA draft with the 32nd overall selection in the 2nd round by the Washington Bullets.

See also
Oklahoma Sooners men's basketball
List of Oklahoma Sooners Men's Basketball Conference Championships
1990 NCAA Division I men's basketball tournament

References

Oklahoma Sooners men's basketball seasons
Oklahoma
Oklahoma